Alexandria is a city in and the county seat of Douglas County, Minnesota, United States. First settled in 1858, it was named after brothers Alexander and William Kinkead from Maryland. The form of the name alludes to Alexandria, Egypt, a center of learning and civilization.

The village of Alexandria was incorporated February 20, 1877. Its city charter was adopted in 1908, and it was incorporated as a city in 1909. W. E. Hicks was pivotal to the town's early development. He purchased the townsite in 1868 and established a mill, hotel, newspaper, and store. He donated property for a courthouse, jail, and two churches: Methodist and Congregational.

The population was 14,335 as of the 2020 census. Alexandria is near I-94, along Minnesota State Highways 27 and 29. It is ten miles south of Lake Carlos State Park. In 2013, Alexandria was named a "Top 10 Best Small Town" by the Livability website. The city is often abbreviated as "Alex" (sometimes pronounced "Alec").

Economy
The city is known as a hot spot for tourism, due to its many lakes and resorts. Tourism events include a Grape Stomp hosted by the Carlos Creek Winery every September, an Apple Fest in October, the Douglas County Fair every August, and Art in the Park every July. The city has a museum housing the Kensington Runestone. Outside the museum stands Big Ole, a 25-foot-tall statue of a Viking built for the 1965 World's Fair in New York City. Extensive repairs to Big Ole were completed in 2016. The city hosts the annual Vikingland Band Festival parade marching championship.

Top employers
According to the Alexandria Area Economic Development Commission, the area's top employers are:

Education

Most children in Alexandria attend school at Alexandria Public Schools, which consists of six kindergarten–5th grade elementary schools (Lincoln, Voyager, Woodland, Carlos, Miltona, Garfield), one 6th–8th grade junior high school (Discovery Middle School), and one new 9th–12th grade senior high school (Alexandria Area High School), which replaced Jefferson High School, which was built in the late 1950s. There are also several independent K–8 Christian schools in the area. Alexandria Technical & Community College offers post-secondary education, including certificate programs, 2-year associate degrees and transferable credits towards 4-year degrees.

Transportation
County Road 82 SE connects Alexandria to Nelson, Osakis and western Minnesota. Minnesota State Highway 29 connects Alexandria to Glenwood and Parkers Prairie. Interstate 94/U.S. Highway 52 passes through the south end of Alexandria, which allows access to Minneapolis-St. Paul and Fargo-Moorhead.

Public transportation in town (and within the surrounding area) is provided by Rainbow Rider.

Airport
The Alexandria Municipal Airport, also known as Chandler Field, is a city-owned public-use airport two nautical miles (3.7 km) southwest of Alexandria's central business district.

Geography
Many of the people who live in Alexandria are not calculated into the population because they are spread out of the city and live on and around the many lakes.

Climate
Alexandria has a dry winter humid continental climate  (Köppen Dwb), with cold, snowy winters and warm (sometimes hot and humid) summers. The autumn and spring are generally pleasant. Average annual precipitation (both snow and rain) is about 25 inches.

Lakes

Lake Carlos
Lake Le Homme Dieu
 Lake Mary
 Lake Agnes
 Lake Andrew
 Lake Brophy
 Lake Cowdry 
Lake Darling
 Lake Geneva
 Lake Henry
 Lake Ida
Lake Latoka
 Lake Louise
 Mill Lake
 Lake Mina
 Smith Lake
 Lobster Lake
 Lake Burgen 
 Stony Lake
 Taylor Lake
 Lake Jessie
 North Union Lake
 Lake Charley
 Union Lake
 Lake Alvin
 Laura Lake
 Lake Winona
 Lake Victoria
 Lake Miltona
 Lake Irene
 Maple Lake
 Lake Reno
 Grant Lake
 Blackwell Lake
 Echo Lake
 Lake Oscar
 Rachel Lake
 Cork Lake
 Mud Lake 
 Vermont Lake
 Pocket Lake

Demographics

2010 census
As of the census of 2010, there were 11,070 people, 5,298 households, and 2,552 families living in the city. The racial makeup of the city was 96.3% White, 0.8% African American, 0.4% Native American, 0.7% Asian, 0.3% from other races, and 1.4% from two or more races. Hispanic or Latino of any race were 1.5% of the population.

There were 5,298 households, of which 21.8% had children under the age of 18 living with them, 35.2% were married couples living together, 9.5% had a female householder with no husband present, 3.4% had a male householder with no wife present, and 51.8% were non-families. 41.8% of all households were made up of individuals, and 18.5% had someone living alone who was 65 years of age or older. The average household size was 2.02 and the average family size was 2.74.

The median age in the city was 38.8 years. 19.1% of residents were under the age of 18; 13.3% were between the ages of 18 and 24; 23.6% were from 25 to 44; 22.1% were from 45 to 64; and 22% were 65 years of age or older. The gender makeup of the city was 48.3% male and 51.7% female.

2000 census
As of the census of 2000, there were 8,820 people. The census listed 4,047 households and 2,011 families living in the city. The city's racial makeup was 97.94% White, 0.42% African American, 0.34% Native American, 0.57% Asian, 0.06% Pacific Islander, 0.18% from other races, and 0.50% from two or more races. Hispanic or Latino of any race were 0.80% of the population.

There were 4,047 households, of which 23.7% had children under 18 living with them, 36.5% were married couples living together, 10.4% had a female householder with no husband present, and 50.3% were non-families. 41.1% of all households were made up of individuals, and 19.3% had someone living alone who 65 or older. The average household size was 2.06 and the average family size was 2.81.

In the city, the population was spread out, with 20.0% under 18, 15.7% from 18 to 24, 24.0% from 25 to 44, 16.7% from 45 to 64, and 23.5% over 66. The median age was 37. For every 100 females, there were 87.2 males. For every 100 females 18 and over, there were 83.7 males.

The median income for a household was $26,851, and the median income for a family was $38,245. Males had a median income of $27,871 versus $20,254 for females. The per capita income was $16,085.  About 7.8% of families and 13.3% of the population were below the poverty line, including 14.2% of those under 18 and 15.7% of those 65 or older.

Media

Newspaper
Alexandria Echo Press is Alexandria's twice-weekly newspaper, owned by the Forum Communications Company.

Television
From 1958 until 2012, Alexandria had at least one local television station, either KCCO or KSAX, and both are still satellites of Minneapolis, MN television stations. KCCO had a presence, first as KCMT, in 1958, as an NBC and ABC affiliate. It switched to CBS affiliation in 1982. Five years later, KSAX regained ABC's presence as a semi-satellite of KSTP-TV. In that same year, KCCO was bought out and became a semi-satellite of WCCO-TV. In 1992, KCCO became a CBS O&O when CBS acquired WCCO and its two satellites.

During KCCO and KSAX's time as semi-satellites, they broadcast local news, weather, and sports through ten-minute cut-in segments during their parent station's newscast. In 2002, KCCO removed its local presence and became a full satellite of WCCO. In June 2012, cost-cutting measures at KSAX resulted in the layoff of all but two employees and the ending of local cut-in broadcasts by any Alexandria television station.

The Alexandria area is also served by Selective TV, Inc., a non-profit, viewer-supported organization which transmits several cable channels free-to-air over standard UHF television frequencies, viewable in any area home without subscription.  Selective TV operates under low power television rules of the FCC and as such was not subject to the analog to digital conversion in 2009. Residents still need a converter box to view KCCO and KSAX on the digital band, though KSAX is still rebroadcast via Selective TV.

Broadcast

Radio

Other forms
The city's unofficial mascot "Big Ole" is featured on the cover of the debut album of the National Beekeepers Society.

Culture
In the 2000s, Justine Harman, an employee of Glamour and the host of the Broken Harts podcast, which covered the Hart family murders, said, "It was a bit more progressive than rural South Dakota, but it wasn't exactly the most tolerant of places, either" in regard to LGBT people.

A 2018 article in The Oregonian described Alexandria as "conservative-leaning".

Sports
The Alexandria Blizzard is a Tier III junior ice hockey team in the North American 3 Hockey League and play out of the Runestone Community Center. From 2006 to 2012, the organization had a Tier II team in the North American Hockey League. The NAHL franchise relocated to Brookings, South Dakota and the current NA3HL franchise took its place.

Viking Speedway hosts weekly Saturday night dirt track racing from April–September and also periodic special, weekend events throughout the year. Five WISSOTA classes run there: Street Stocks, Midwest Modifieds, Super Stocks, Modifieds, and Late Models. Viking Speedway was awarded WISSOTA's "2005 Track of the Year".

One night per summer, a Northwoods League baseball game is held at Knute Nelson Memorial Park. The Willmar Stingers become the Alexandria Beetles to pay homage to the time when Alexandria had its own team. The Beetles were in operation from 2001 to 2012 and were renamed the Alexandria Blue Anchors in 2013. The team folded after the 2015 season.

Notable people

Lars K. Aaker, state legislator
Richard Battey, judge
Hilda Bettermann, state representative 
Marvin W. Bursch, state legislator and businessman
Dave Dalby, center for the Oakland Raiders 
Walter H. Campbell, state legislator, businessman and lawyer
Frederick J. Foslien, state legislator, farmer, and businessman
John Hammergren, CEO of McKesson Corporation
Duane Hanson, sculptor
Edward Hanson, 28th governor of American Samoa
Jennifer and Sarah Hart, perpetrators of the Hart family murders 
Hal Haskins, professional basketball player
John Hawkes, actor
Todd Hendricks, professional football player
Jed Johnson, interior designer and film director
Peter Krause, actor
Tom Lehman, PGA golfer
Brock Lesnar, professional wrestler and former mixed martial artist
Clifford Lofvegren, state legislator, businessman, and farmer
Knute Nelson, U.S. senator
Julian O. Newhouse, businessman and state legislator
Walter Roth, farmer and state legislator
Gary Serum, pitcher for the Minnesota Twins
Henrik Shipstead, U.S. senator
Cliff Sterrett, cartoonist
Bruce P. Smith, halfback for the Green Bay Packers and the Los Angeles Rams
Hill H. Wilson, businessman and state legislator
Theodore G. Winkjer, businessman, farmer, and state legislator

See also
Alexandria Lakes AVA

References

External links

 City of Alexandria Official Website
 Alexandria Independent School District
 Alexandria Lakes Area Chamber of Commerce
 Alexandria Hotel & Hospitality, Convention & Visitor's Bureau
 Alexandria Tourism Official Website
 Alexandria Area Economic Development Commission Website
 Alexandria, Minnesota Real Estate
 Alexandria, Minnesota Police Department

Cities in Minnesota
Cities in Douglas County, Minnesota
County seats in Minnesota
Populated places established in 1858
1858 establishments in Minnesota